Luc Dufour (born February 13, 1963) is a Canadian former professional ice hockey player who played 167 games in the National Hockey League. He played for the Boston Bruins, Quebec Nordiques, and St. Louis Blues. Dufour accumulated a total of 44 points and 199 penalty minutes in his 167 games played in the NHL. As a youth, he played in the 1975 and 1976 Quebec International Pee-Wee Hockey Tournaments with a minor ice hockey team from Chicoutimi.

Career statistics

Regular season and playoffs

References

External links
 

1963 births
Living people
Boston Bruins draft picks
Boston Bruins players
Canadian ice hockey centres
Chicoutimi Saguenéens (QMJHL) players
Fredericton Express players
French Quebecers
Canadian expatriate ice hockey players in Italy
Hershey Bears players
Ice hockey people from Quebec
Maine Mariners players
Quebec Nordiques players
St. Louis Blues players
Sportspeople from Saguenay, Quebec
Canadian expatriate ice hockey players in the United States